Christy is an American period drama series which aired on CBS from April 1994 to August 1995, for twenty episodes.

Christy was based on the 1967 novel Christy by Catherine Marshall, the widow of Senate chaplain Peter Marshall. Inspired by the experiences of the author's mother, the novel had been a bestseller in 1968, and the week following the debut of the TV-movie and program saw the novel jump from #120 up to #15 on the USA Today bestseller list. Series regular Tyne Daly won an Emmy Award for her work on the series.

Cast
Kellie Martin as Christy Huddleston
Randall Batinkoff as Rev. David Grantland
Stewart Finlay-McLennan as Dr. Neil MacNeill
Tyne Daly as Alice Henderson
Emily Schulman as Ruby Mae Morrison
Tess Harper as Fairlight Spencer
LeVar Burton as Daniel Scott (Season 2)
Sally Smithwick as Bessie Coburn
Collin Wilcox as Swannie O'Teale
Scott Latham as Festus Allen
Sam Tyler Wayman as John Spencer

Storyline and characters
The show starred Kellie Martin as Christy Huddleston, a new teacher arriving to the fictional Appalachian village of Cutter Gap, Tennessee, in 1912. The villagers have old-fashioned ways. For example, they maintain rules and vengeances similar to the Highland clans of old Scotland. They also have a strong belief in folk medicine. At the same time many of their ways are portrayed in an idealized fashion as well. The show emphasized their culture by making Christy, and most of the main cast, outsiders in one fashion or the other. These "outsiders" included a minister, David Grantland (played by Randall Batinkoff); and Quaker missionary woman Alice Henderson, played by Tyne Daly. The television show maintained the book's romance novel element by showing Christy drawn both to the minister and the doctor.

The show's last episode was a cliffhanger concerning Christy's fate in the town and with the two rival male love interests. Later TV movies resolved the love triangle according to the ending of the novel.

Christy was developed for television by Emmy Award-winning writer Patricia Green.

Reception and cancellation

The show received mixed reviews from critics. Writing for the Washington Post, Tom Shales said: "It is earnest, well intentioned, based on a beloved book by Catherine Marshall, handsomely photographed, wholesome as a tea cozy, cute as a kitten and almost unspeakably humdrum." He criticized the performances of Martin and Batinkoff.

John J. O’Connor of the New York Times was more positive. "This is an impressive production," he wrote. "The cast is generally quite good; Ms. Martin is extraordinary, making Christy's fresh-faced innocence utterly captivating on these beautiful and sometimes dangerous mountains." Howard Rosenberg of the Los Angeles Times called it "highly appealing" and "too nice to pick apart."

The series developed a loyal following among readers of the novel and families. It was an initial ratings success, with the pilot episode placing fifth in the weekly Nielsen ratings and inspiring hundreds of letters to CBS from grateful viewers. But it later faltered, as it came on in a period of two years where CBS lost strong affiliates to Fox due to NFL football rights and issues with CBS that had built up years before. Episodes were also expensive to produce, with each installment costing $1.2 million despite generating advertising revenues of only $900,000, in part because it performed poorly among young urban viewers most highly sought by advertisers. The series was cancelled by the network to make way for an attempt to program for younger audiences, but the show's fanbase remained strong despite the cancellation.

Episodes

Season 1: 1994

Season 2: 1994–95

Television movies

In 2000, the family-friendly network Pax TV produced three made-for-television movies based on unresolved stories from the novel and original CBS series in response to demand from loyal fans, though Kellie Martin did not return as Christy, with Lauren Lee Smith taking over the role. On November 19, 2000, Pax aired Christy: The Movie. The second and third films aired in 2001 as a two part mini-series entitled Christy, Choices of the Heart, with Part 1 entitled Christy: A Change of Seasons and airing on May 13, 2001, and Part 2 entitled Christy: A New Beginning and airing on May 14, 2001. Stewart Finlay-McLennan (who played Doctor MacNeill), Bruce McKinnon (Jeb Spencer), Mike Hickman (Bird's Eye Taylor), Andy Stahl (Tom McHone), and Dale Dickey (Opal McHone) were the only original TV-series cast members to appear in the telefilms.

The Christy movies were developed for television by executive producer Tom Blomquist, who served as supervising producer of the original CBS series.

Syndication

The show began airing on Gospel Music Channel in June 2009, with a later migration to INSP.

Home media
20th Century Fox released the complete series on DVD in Region 1 on March 20, 2007.

Festival
An annual festival, called "ChristyFest," dedicated to Christy, the novel, television series and movies, was held in Townsend, Tennessee, also home to a private, non-profit museum called Great Smoky Mountains Heritage Center. Taking place during summer, it was a gathering of those dedicated to the preservation of "Christy" and Southern Appalachian culture. Early in 2018 it was announced that the ChristyFest event would never again be held, but that a successor organization called "Christy Friends" would preserve its spirit.

See also
 1994 in American television
 1995 in American television
 Appalachian stereotypes
 Great Smoky Mountains Heritage Center
 Music of East Tennessee

References

External links

Christy at TVGuide.com
Fan Site for Christy and McNeill
A Christy Fan Site
Catherine Marshall's Masterpiece: Christy
Notes about location of Christy filming from TripAdvisor.com
ChristyFest online forum

1994 American television series debuts
1995 American television series endings
1990s American drama television series
Christy (novel)
CBS original programming
Christian entertainment television series
English-language television shows
Fiction set in 1912
Television series set in the 1910s
Period family drama television series
Primetime Emmy Award-winning television series
Television shows based on American novels
Television series by 20th Century Fox Television
Television shows set in Tennessee
Films set in Appalachia
Television series by MTM Enterprises